Science and Creationism is a book edited by Ashley Montagu.

Plot summary
Science and Creationism is a book containing essays by many writers including Isaac Asimov.

Reception
Dave Langford reviewed Science and Creationism for White Dwarf #75, and stated that "reveals just how intellectually poverty-stricken the creationist movement is. Academic bloodshed on a vast scale: I loved it."

References

Criticism of creationism